Major General Paul J. Vanderploog, USA (born March 22, 1941) is a retired American Quartermaster officer who served as the 41st Quartermaster General of the United States Army from 1989 to 1991. He was inducted into the U.S. Army Quartermaster Foundation's Hall of Fame in 2010.

Early life
Major General Venderploog was born in Rochester, New York.  In 1963, he was commissioned as a Second Lieutenant and awarded a Bachelor of Science Degree from Syracuse University.

Military service
He served in numerous command and staff positions including command of the Aerial Equipment Support Company, 15th Supply and Service Battalion, 1st Cavalry Division, Republic of Vietnam and as Executive Officer, J4, Military Assistance Command, Vietnam. He next assignment was the Office of the Deputy Chief of Staff for Logistics, Department of the Army. While in this assignment he was selected to serve as a Military Assistant to the Under Secretary of the Army.

His senior command assignments include Director, J-4, United States European Command; Director of Logistics and Security Assistance, J4/7, United States Central Command; Commanding General U.S. Army Quartermaster Center and School; Commanding General, 2nd Support Command; and Commander, Division Support Command, 3rd Infantry Division (United States).

He retired from the Army on June 30, 1996.

Post retirement
Since retirement, Vanderploog has served as the Director of Water Resource Services Hillsborough County, Florida.

Education
He holds a master's degree in Business Administration from Virginia Commonwealth University.  His military education includes the Infantry Officer Basic Course, Quartermaster Officer Advanced Course, the Marine Corps Command and Staff College and the Industrial College of the Armed Forces.

Decorations and honors 
 Defense Distinguished Service Medal
 Distinguished Service Medal (U.S. Army)
 Legion of Merit
 Bronze Star Medal with Oak leaf Cluster
 Meritorious Service Medal with Oak Leaf Cluster
 Air Medal
 Joint Service Commendation Medal
 Army Commendation Medal with Oak Leaf Cluster
 Commanders Cross of the Order of Merit of the Federal Republic of Germany
 Parachutist Badge
 Parachute Rigger Badge
 Army Staff Identification Badge

Major General Vanderploog is a distinguished member of the Quartermaster Regiment and was inducted into the U.S. Army Quartermaster Hall of Fame in June 2010.

References

United States Army generals
Recipients of the Legion of Merit
Living people
American people of Dutch descent
United States Army Command and General Staff College alumni
Quartermasters General of the United States Army
Commanders Crosses of the Order of Merit of the Federal Republic of Germany
1941 births
Recipients of the Air Medal
Recipients of the Distinguished Service Medal (US Army)
Recipients of the Defense Distinguished Service Medal